The 1923 Bucknell Bison football team was an American football team that represented Bucknell University as an independent during the 1923 college football season. In its fifth and final season under head coach Pete Reynolds, the team compiled a 4–4–1 record.

The team played its home games at Tustin Field in Lewisburg, Pennsylvania.

Schedule

References

Bucknell
Bucknell Bison football seasons
Bucknell Bison football